Lujhu District is a suburban district of Kaohsiung City, Taiwan.

History
After the handover of Taiwan from Japan to the Republic of China in 1945, Lujhu was organized as a rural township of Kaohsiung County. On 25 December 2010, Kaohsiung County was merged with Kaohsiung City and Lujhu was upgraded to a district of the city.

Administrative divisions
The district consists of Zhuhu, Dingliao, Xinda, Houxiang, Beiling, Shexi, Jiabei, Jianan, Xiakeng, Zhuyuan, Zhutung, Zhuxi, Wenbei, Wennan, SanyevYaliao, Shetung, Shezhong, Zhunan and Shenan Village.

Politics
The district is part of Kaohsiung City Constituency II electoral district for Legislative Yuan.

Education
 Kao Yuan University
 Shu Zen College of Medicine and Management

Transportation

 TRA Dahu Station
 TRA Luzhu Station

Tourist attractions
 Yijia Guanyin Temple
 Huashan Temple (dedicated to Lord Ningjing)

Notable natives
 Wang Jin-pyng, President of Legislative Yuan (1999-2016)

See also
 Kaohsiung

References

External links 

 

Districts of Kaohsiung